The 1989–90 Courage League National Division Two  was the third full season of rugby union within the second tier of the English league system, currently known as the RFU Championship. Each team played one match against each of the other teams in the league, playing a total of eleven matches. Three teams participated in the division for the first time. They were Waterloo who were relegated from last seasons Division One, and Rugby and Plymouth Albion who were promoted from Division Three. They joined the nine teams who remained from the previous seasons.

Northampton, the champions, were promoted to the Courage League National Division One for season 1990–91 along with the runners–up Liverpool St Helens. It was the second time in three seasons that Liverpool St Helens won promotion from National Division Two. Due to the expansion of the national divisions there was no relegation to Courage League National Division Three.

Participating teams

Table

Sponsorship
National Division Two is part of the Courage Clubs Championship and is sponsored by Courage Brewery

See also
 English rugby union system

References 

N2
RFU Championship seasons